Thomas Laurens Jones (January 22, 1819 – June 20, 1887) was a U.S. Representative from Kentucky.

Born in White Oak, North Carolina, Jones attended private schools. He graduated from Princeton College and from the law department of Harvard University. He was admitted to the bar in Columbia, South Carolina, in 1846 and commenced practice in New York City in 1847. He moved to Newport, Kentucky, in 1849 and continued the practice of law. He served as a member of the State house of representatives from Campbell County 1853–1855.

Jones was elected as a Democrat to the Fortieth and Forty-first Congresses (March 4, 1867 – March 3, 1871). He was not a candidate for renomination in 1870.

Jones was elected to the Forty-fourth Congress (March 4, 1875 – March 3, 1877). He served as chairman of the Committee on Railways and Canals (Forty-fourth Congress). He was not a candidate for renomination. He resumed the practice of law. He died in Newport, Kentucky, June 20, 1887. He was interred in Evergreen Cemetery.

References

External links
Thomas Laurens Jones entry at The Political Graveyard
 

1819 births
1887 deaths
Harvard Law School alumni
Kentucky lawyers
Democratic Party members of the Kentucky House of Representatives
New York (state) lawyers
People from Bladen County, North Carolina
People from Newport, Kentucky
Princeton University alumni
South Carolina lawyers
Democratic Party members of the United States House of Representatives from Kentucky
19th-century American politicians
19th-century American lawyers